The 2005 Finnish Figure Skating Championships took place between December 18 and 19, 2004 in Hämeenlinna. Skaters competed in the disciplines of men's singles and women's singles on the senior and junior levels. The event was used to help determine the Finnish team to the 2005 European Championships.

Senior results

Men

Ladies

External links
 results

2004 in figure skating
Finnish Figure Skating Championships, 2005
Finnish Figure Skating Championships
2004 in Finnish sport
2005 in Finnish sport